The Spain national amateur football team is the amateur representative team for Spain at football.

It was formed in 1950s to play Mediterranean Games, UEFA Amateur Cup and, until 1988, Summer Olympics football tournaments.

Olympic record

Mediterranean Games record

Players

Amateur
Spain
Spain